Culsalmond was a 16th-century castle about  south east of Huntly, Aberdeenshire, Scotland, near the river Ury.

History
The castle is thought to have been a property of the Gordons.  The view that it existed by 1591 but was unroofed in 1594 is disputed.

Structure
The property may well have been at the site of Newton House, a house with four stories and an attic, which dates from the late 17th century. However, there is no trace of remains.

See also
Castles in Great Britain and Ireland
List of castles in Scotland

References

Castles in Highland (council area)